Burton Arms Apartments was an edifice completed in December 1922, located at 2115 Walton Avenue and 181st Street (Manhattan) in the Bronx. The building was one block from Lexington Avenue (Manhattan)-Jerome Avenue. Advertised as the most beautiful apartment house in New York City, it could be reached via the 6th Avenue (Manhattan) - 9th Avenue (Manhattan) subway or the L at Burnside Avenue. 3,4, or 5 room rentals were available. Burton Arms Apartments is important as an early 1920s structure which provided comfortable living quarters as well as accommodations for businesses.

On a plot 75 X 100 feet, it was purchased by Maurice Forman from Survell Realty Company in March 1923. At this time, it was completely rented, including its eight stores. The structure sold for $210,000, purchased from the Armstrong Brothers.

In 1926, Burton Arms Apartments brought an annual rental of $29,000. The edifice was sold to Joseph Wikler by the Harstein Brothers in October 1926.

References

1922 establishments in New York City
Residential buildings in the Bronx
Cultural history of New York City
History of New York City
History of the Bronx